Roberto McCausland-Dieppa, also known as "Dieppa", is a Colombian pianist, composer, and conductor, specializing in classical, jazz, and Hungarian music. The artist is the first Colombian-born pianist to have performed successfully in worldwide venues. He is the conductor of Sinfonia Latina. and helped start the Santa Fe-Barlovento Orchestra. His performances at various venues across the United States, Asia, Australia, and Europe, are noted such as Carnegie Hall, Ostrogskich-Chopin Hall, and the United Nations.

"Dieppa" became known after composing and conducting ‘'Sinfonia Latina’' at age seventeen in 1976, the composition fused Rock, Jazz, Salsa, and Spanish music into a symphonic format. The event "Sinfonía Latina" denominated ‘Super Show’ over-exceeded expected attendance, Noted as ‘Avant-garde’ and  ‘revolutionary’, it pushed the boundaries of popular salsa, autochthonous dance rhythms, rock, and jazz with a classical framework into the modern concert hall, with poetic (protest) lyrics in Spanish.

Following the Sinfonia Latina event, he moved on to classical performances, composing and conducting becoming a critical figure in music education for children, disseminating Caribbean music using  ‘folk idioms’ and "dance" rhythm, espousing Hungarian music and culture, particularly the music of Franz Liszt, Béla Bartók which he is most passionately interested.

Career 
The multifaceted artist began his career with the successful composition and performances of the Sinfonia Latina concert in 1976. Franz Liszt and Bela Bartok became the primary classical music influences. His presentation at the Budapest Spring Festival launched programs at Bern, Madrid, Vienna, and many other important musical centers including New York's, Carnegie Weill Hall, where he was asked eight times back on stage, Sydney- Melbourne, Australia, and New Delhi, India. Following were performances in Rome, London, Washington, DC.  Paris, and Warsaw.

Characteristics 
“Dieppa" looks like the part of a fantastic character not far removed from Willie Wonka. He wears tresses that confer a young Einstein expression, intoxicated with music. The pianist accentuates a peculiar manifestation by wearing rounded glasses a la Franz Schubert and vibrant scarves like Glenn Gould. "Dieppa" makes fundamental advancements in music imparting to Barranquilla and Colombia a composer considered necessary flanking the other two iconic resident's laureate Noble prize winner Gabriel Garcia Marquez and the Painter Alejandro Obregon.

Pianism 
In the review of Autumn Passion Four Great Sonatas; Ludwig van Beethoven. reviewer Jerry Dubbins wrote:" This is a serious and significant release by a serious and significant performing artist far from what's often described depreciatingly as a vanity release. The result is performances of clarity, transparency, and revelation of felicitous details that allow the notes to speak for themselves, one of the countless points at which "Dieppa's"  respectful approach to these works yields a refreshing perspective on Beethoven's vision, cleansed of the interpretive accretions of 200 years of performance practices. "Dieppa's" Beethoven comes about as close to "echt" as I've heard. In whatever form you find it, it is an experience not to be missed.  In classical repertoire, whether it is Liszt, Ravel, Debussy, Chopin, Mozart, or Beethoven, the music is about the composer. There is fluidity to his pianism with sensitivity to dynamics.    

Beethoven Piano Sonatas Nos.23, 8,14, 26,11 & 111 Appassionata, Pathetique, Kuupaistesonaat, 

are distinguished by poetic and sensitive interpretation.

Huntley Dent in reviewing "Dieppa's" interpretations of "Moonlight" Sonata, "Pathetique", and "Appassionata" states; "none come festooned with such an exotic pedigree." The reviewer makes comparisons to three top interpreters; Michelangeli, Claudio Arrau, and implies he surpassed Serkin, asking where was he?, when the intoxicating music of the Colombian Caribbean coast beckoned or Beethoven for kids was in the studio, Michelangeli was nowhere to be found, and if Claudio Arrau was sent a pair of glowing yellow spectacles he promptly returned them. These readings are more than adept far from academic, he conveys what he feels about each sonata.

“Roberto McCausland “Dieppa" performs a compelling account of Notturno from Liebesträume. In his own works Inspiracion, Besame mucho and Insensetaz he displays a Lisztian virtuosity."

Composing style 
In orchestral chamber and small ensembles the composer employs a synesthetic approach bringing together autochthonous elements of Caribbean folk rhythms prevalent in Salsa, Merengue, and Cumbia into Rock, and Jazz in classical architecture, thus, creating the genre style "Nouveau" Caribe.  However, the piano compositional writing displays Lisztian virtuosity.

Conducting style 
A noted feature of the conductor's style is his ability to conduct without a baton. This eccentricity was observed by Juan B. Fernandez author and editor of El Heraldo comparing him to a young Arturo Toscanini. It is generally considered of great importance to a conductor's ability to communicate with the orchestra.  

As Igor Stravinsky "Dieppa's" conducting style came about as a necessity to disseminate the music and expand the Orchestra beyond traditional boundaries.

Literature

Author 
Author of over 30 articles about classical music and Caribbean culture, published in journals and periodicals. "Dieppa" is the creator of Beethoven for kids and teens, and Beethoven for kids. A series of books in various formats presented in both narrative audio and CDs for children and young people.

Writings 
Beethoven's friends published in Latitude on August 3, 2014.Jornal del Caribe :about our culture, world music and good espresso coffee (No.1).Jornal del Caribe: Franz Liszt and the music of the Caribbean: rhythm, dance and language, love is a rebellious bird and good espresso coffee (No. 2) Jornal del Caribe  (No. 3)The Caribbean and World Culture: music, rhythm, dance and language V. Jornal del Caribe: Pod, Al Carnaval, Carla Celia y Guillo Carbo VI. Jornal del Caribe: Pod Ciclo Mujeres en las Artes  VII. Cleopatra, philosopher VIII. La Seducción Artística Femenina IX. La Seduccion de Bolivar X. Así hablo Zarathustra XI. Carmen Magdalena, Frida Kahlo, Isabel Allende Llona XII. Pasión Caribe y Latino Americana XIII. Beethoven: Sonatas, Concertí y Sinfonías

Select discography 
Caribe al Mundo  was released on the Scruffy records label in 2013 catalog # 67129. The disc features Tres Piezas  Encantadas para Orquesta  composed in  "Nouveau" Caribe genre  1. Inspiracion- De un Tema sobre el Rio Magdalena, 2. Fuga Rítmica Flamenca Caribe sobre la Pollera Colora 3. Cancion del Amor MisteriosoDanza- Requiem a Joe Arroyo.

A champion of Liszt's there are three recordings of Sonata in B minor; 1. Liszt and more... September 15, 1997, catalog # 67122. 2. Music from the Documentary 2013catalog # 67226. 3. Summer Le Chaluer Estivale, Liszt 2014 catalog # 020568658. There is a YouTube video recording, Sonata in B Minor, S.178.

Other well-known recordings are Autumn: Passion- Beethoven Three Great Sonatas 2014 catalog #020567, Beethoven for kids and teens released in 2003 catalog # 634479694622, Beethoven for kids released on 23 May 2006catalog#376642H1, and Late Night: Encores II 2014 catalog# 020566658

The public associates "Dieppa" with the works of Beethoven, Liszt, and Bartok.

Legacy

Sinfonia Latina Festival and orchestral residency 
The Inter-American Development Bank sponsors the music education area program for Sinfonia Latina music Festival Orchestral Residency in Barranquilla, Colombia. The IDB and IDB Invest assembly of governors 2021, gifts children, and young people of Barranquilla, and its metropolitan area the application, operation, and practice of the festival an orchestral residency program. The Festival's mission is excellence in performance, education, and social work through the arts for community development. Scheduled annually, the event takes place two weeks after the cities carnival. Puerto Colombia Foundation, of Barranquilla, Colombia, is the executing entity using the arts for education and social development.   Initially planned for March 2020, the event was postponed to March 2022 – 2023 due to the COVID-19 pandemic. Beethoven's Fifth Symphony and autochthonous-based work composed by Mr. Dieppa are part of the program. The Festival and Residency include the donation of musical instruments, lectures in universities, conservatories, and schools; accompanied by a series of workshops on music instruction and training for teachers attached to the youth orchestra system.

The resident ensemble is the Orchestra of Saint Luke's, New York City, conducted by Roberto McCausland "Dieppa".

Awards and honors 
In 2002, "Dieppa" was awarded the Merrill Lynch Prize for teaching piano while instructing at the School of Fine Arts in Cleveland.

In 2006, he was awarded the Pro-Arte Hungarica prize by the Hungarian government's Ministry of Culture for his work and performances of Hungarian composers Franz Liszt and Bela Bartok.

In 2006, "Dieppa" was invited by the United Nations to perform at the commemorative event marking the 50th anniversary of the 1956 Hungarian revolution.

References

External links 
 Official website
 Dieppa's discography at AllMusic

Colombian pianists
Colombian composers
Colombian classical musicians
Living people
21st-century pianists
1959 births